Páraic Duffy served as the 18th Director General of the Gaelic Athletic Association.

A former chairman of the Monaghan County Board, he replaced Liam Mulvihill in February 2008 and was succeeded by Tom Ryan in April 2018. Paraic was the GAA's player welfare officer from 2006, prior to his appointment as Director General on February 1, 2008. In 2006, Duffy was the chairman of the National Audit Committee and worked on the Coaching and Games Development Committee between 2003 and 2006. He also has previously chaired the GAA's Games Administration Committee between 2000 and 2003. During his playing years as a Gaelic footballer, Paraic had played  with Castleblayney Faughs and also was one of the selectors of the Monaghan senior county side between 1983 and 1987. He was previously a Secondary School Principal at St Macartan's College in County Monaghan., being the first lay principal of that Catholic college.

References

Year of birth missing (living people)
Living people
Chairmen of county boards of the Gaelic Athletic Association
Gaelic games administrators
Heads of schools in Ireland
Monaghan County Board administrators
People educated at St Macartan's College, Monaghan